is a Japanese manga artist. She debuted in 1994 with Headstrong Cinderella, which won the 19th Nakayoshi Rookie Award. She is best known for Zodiac P.I., Something's Wrong with Us as well as Kitchen Princess, the latter for which she won the Kodansha Manga Award for children's manga in 2006. Something's Wrong with Us received a live-action Japanese television drama adaptation that premiered on Nippon TV on August 12, 2020, starring Minami Hamabe and Ryusei Yokohama.

Works
(April–November 1998, Nakayoshi, Kodansha, 1 volume) 
 (February 1999–?, Nakayoshi, Kodansha, 2 volumes)
 (2000)
 (April 2001–January 2003, Nakayoshi, Kodansha, 4 volumes; English translation, 2003)
 (2003)
 (April 2003–May 2004, Nakayoshi, Kodansha, 3 volumes; English translation, 2010)
 (September 2004—October 2008, Nakayoshi, Kodansha, 10 volumes; English translation, 2007)
 (February 2009—September 2012, Nakayoshi, Kodansha, 12 volumes; English translation, 2010)
 (February 2013–February 2014, Nakayoshi, Kodansha, 3 volumes; English translation, 2015)
 (April 2014, Nakayoshi, oneshot)
(February 2015–ongoing, BE LOVE, Kodansha, 3 volumes)
(December 2016-July 2021, Kodansha, 16 volumes; English translation, 2020)

References

External links
 
 

Manga artists from Aichi Prefecture
Living people
Year of birth missing (living people)